Brian or Bryan Graham may refer to:

 Brian Graham (baseball) (born 1960), former minor league baseball player, coach and manager
 Brian Graham (footballer) (born 1987), Scottish footballer for Partick Thistle
 Brian Graham (rugby league) (born 1936), Australian rugby league footballer
 Bryan S. Graham, economist and professor